Ermes may refer to:
 ERMES, the European radio paging system
 Ermes (name), including a list of people with the name
 Ermes di Colorêt (1622–1692), Italian count and writer
 Ermes, a brand name used in 2003 by the Woolworths chain of stores in Cyprus

See also 
 Ērģeme, a village in Latvia
 Ernes, a commune in Normandy, France